Newberry College is a private Lutheran college in Newberry, South Carolina. It has 1,250 students.

Accreditation
Newberry College is accredited by the Commission on Colleges of the Southern Association of Colleges and Schools (SACS) to award bachelor's degrees.

Athletics

Newberry athletic teams are the Wolves. The college is a member of the Division II level of the National Collegiate Athletic Association (NCAA), primarily competing in the South Atlantic Conference (SAC) since the 1996–97 academic year. The Wolves previously competed in the Carolinas Intercollegiate Athletic Conference (CIAC, now known as Conference Carolinas) of the National Association of Intercollegiate Athletics (NAIA) from 1961–62 to 1971–72.

Newberry competes in 18 intercollegiate varsity sports: Men's sports include baseball, basketball, cross country, football, golf, lacrosse, soccer, tennis and wrestling; while women's sports include basketball, cross country, field hockey, golf, lacrosse, soccer, softball, tennis and volleyball.

The school is famous for being on the losing end of a tilt against Furman University, in which Frank Selvy scored 100 points.

Music program
The music program at Newberry College has a history in vocal and instrumental performance dating back over 100 years and a jazz band and marching band in existence since 1956. In 1956, a major turning point in the school's musical history took place, when respected military band leader and alumnus Charles "Chief" Pruitt organized the jazz band and the marching band after returning to the school to teach music.

The Newberry College marching band, which has been in existence since that time, is one of the most unusual aspects of Newberry College's music program. Newberry is one of the smallest colleges in the country with a marching band, and it is the only Lutheran school in the country with a marching band.

Also in 1956, Pruitt hosted the first jazz festival at Newberry College. This jazz festival has since become a unique annual tradition at Newberry College, and is considered to be the second oldest jazz festival in the nation.

V-12: Navy College Training Program
In 1943, Secretary of the Navy Frank Knox announced the start of a new college training program, the V-12 Navy College Training Program. The program was designed to supplement the force of commissioned officers in the United States Navy during World War II. Newberry College became one of 131 colleges and universities in the United States chosen to participate in the V-12 program.

On July 1, 1943, the first 325 cadets arrived on campus; they included both V-12 Cadets and V-5 Aviation Cadets.

The cadets attended classes for periods of one to six terms of 16 weeks. Work was planned so that each term was the equivalent of a normal college semester. The Navy handled the discipline of its cadets, directed the physical fitness program, provided military drills and cooperated with the College in the direction of the program.

During the 27 months the V-12 Program were a part of the college, over 1,000 cadets were assigned to Newberry. On October 31, 1945, the V-12 Unit was decommissioned and Newberry College returned to its civilian status.

Notable alumni
 Corey Anderson – professional mixed martial artist; Ultimate Fighter 19 winner, competing in the UFC's Light Heavyweight Division
 Kelly Anundson, professional MMA fighter
 Lee Atwater
 Dike Beede
 Coleman Livingston Blease
 Brandon Bostick
 Henry L. Carroll
 Frederick H. Dominick
 Cody Garbrandt – professional mixed martial artist; former UFC Bantamweight Champion 
 Mark Hammond
 Butler B. Hare
 James Butler Hare
 Greg Hartle
 James Haskell Hope
 Stuart Lake
 Asbury Francis Lever
 Mike Longabardi
 Debola Ogunseye
 Ron Parker
 Amanda Pennekamp
 John H. Pitchford (1857–1923) – lawyer and politician, served on the Oklahoma Supreme Court (1921–23) and died in office
 Billy Rhiel
 Ralph Rowe
 Corey Washington

See also

References

External links

 
 Official athletics website

 
Buildings and structures in Newberry County, South Carolina
Educational institutions established in 1856
1856 establishments in South Carolina
Private universities and colleges in South Carolina